Conjestina Achieng (born 20 October 1977 in Umiru village, Yala division, Siaya District. Conjestina is the fifth born in a family of ten. Her father Clement Adalo is a retired medical officer and her mother is Gertrude Auma. Her elder brother, Joseph Kusimba is an ex-boxer who runs a boxing club in Mathare, Nairobi.
She is a Kenyan female boxer who has been nicknamed "Hands of Stone" and is ranked number five in the world. She became the first African woman to hold an international title when she beat Ugandan Fiona Tugume to take the vacant WIBF Middleweight title. She also lost out in controversial title fight circumstances to then WBC, and WBA Super middleweight Natascha Ragosina Achieng, a single mother, plays in the middleweight division.

Personal life 
Being otherwise unemployed, Achieng, who normally earned about $250 a fight, relied on boxing to pay for her inexpensive one-room rented apartment in Nairobi's impoverished Lucky Summer estate. Her greatest challenge was to finance her training and maintain a well-balanced diet. In a country where many survive on less than $1 a day, Achieng struggled to put food on the table and meet her basic needs. Government support for training facilities and equipment is limited and reliable boxing promoters are rare, so prize money is hard to come by.

"I earn a living the hard way", she said in an interview with Women Boxing Archive Network. "I can't afford the right foods and sometimes I don't even have the bus fare to go for training. When I look at other boxers like Mike Tyson and Laila Ali, my soul bleeds. They are rich and the kind of life they lead is not comparable to ours. But us we lead a dog's life. Things don’t fall on a silver plate. Every individual has to reap where he or she has sown and I am no exception."

"In Kenya, boxing is not well paying as people may think. I don’t have a permanent salary and I’m only paid when there is a fight and if I have won.  Boxing is hard and should be treated with the seriousness it deserves. One has to be committed and train hard."

"I have a son and younger sisters who are still in school, and all of them depend on me. My aging parents can no longer afford to cater for these people and I’m left in charge," she added.

Achieng's day began at 5.30 a.m. with 15 km of road work, then at 8.30 am she resumed her normal gym training till midday. "I enjoy boxing in the company of male boxers", said Achieng. "We train and share ideas."

In any spare time she volunteered at a nearby school assisting children through their assignments and marking their books. The school's owner, Jean Ikenga has always supported Achieng and sometimes paid her rent.

When Conjestina was in school she excelled in arts and crafts, and still pursues drawing and painting. Some of her work is displayed at Upendo Nursery in Mathare North.  She said that one of her aims is to nurture young and aspiring artists.

She also wanted to fight Laila Ali. "I am training hard and hope to face her in the ring. She does not sound a threat to me and I long to fight her. I will decide on whether to continue boxing or stop only after I snatch that title from her."   Her promoter Caleb Kuya, a Danish-based Kenyan, was equally confident but said "Conje" needs at least three more fights under her belt before she faces Ali, especially as she has boxed professionally only once outside Kenya. "She will be much better if she fights out of the country to get the feel of away matches and even jeering from other fans," he said as he outlined plans for seeking sponsorships for a potential Achieng vs. Ali showdown.

Health issues 
In January 2011, Conjestina's father sent an appeal to Kenyans to help him take her to hospital after her behaviour deteriorated from the norm. According to her father, Conjestina had removed her son from school, set ablaze to all her boxing gear and disposed of all the equipment from her gymnasium, which she had opened in 2009. She was admitted at the Mathari hospital in Nairobi which specialises in mental health care. She was later released.

On 4 September 2012. a story ran on Citizen TV showing Conjestina in a state of confusion and utter despair. The former boxer showed off her belts. She was said to be living in poverty having not paid her Ksh 2000 ($23) rent for 4 months. She was under the care of her younger sister. Conjestina was later taken to the Mathari Hospital by Ida Odinga. A popular campaign on social media raised enough money for her to move into a more comfortable dwelling. The comedian Daniel Ndambuki (Churchill) personally donated 180,000 s to pay her rent after public pressure reminded him of a promise he had made to support her.

Professional boxing record

See also 
 List of female boxers
 Luo people of Kenya and Tanzania

References

External links 
Conjestina Achieng at Awakening Fighters
WBAN Biography
Presentation on boxrec.com

Living people
1977 births
Kenyan women boxers
Kenyan Luo people
People from Siaya County
Middleweight boxers